False Prophets may refer to:

False prophet, a concept in Judaism, Christianity and Islam
False Prophets (band), a US punk band
"False Prophets" (J. Cole song), a 2016 song by J. Cole